Three Men in the Snow is a 1955 German comedy film based on the eponymous novel by Erich Kästner.

Cast 
Source:

 Paul Dahlke – Geheimrat Eduard Schlüter
 Günther Lüders – Johann Kesselhut
 Claus Biederstaedt – Dr. Fritz Hagedorn
 Nicole Heesters – Hildegard Schlüter
 Margarete Haagen – Frau Kunkel
 Alma Seidler – Mutter Hagedorn
 Eva Maria Meineke – Frau Thea Casparius 
 Franz Muxeneder – Graswander Toni, Ski-Lehrer
 Hans Olden – Direktor Kühne
 Fritz Imhoff – Portier Polter
 Richard Eybner – Herr Heltai

See also 
 A Rare Bird (1935)
 Three Men in the Snow (1936)
 Paradise for Three (1938)
 Three Men in the Snow (1974)

References

Further reading

External links 
 

1955 comedy films
1955 films
German comedy films
West German films
Films directed by Kurt Hoffmann
Films based on works by Erich Kästner
Remakes of French films
Films set in hotels
Films set in the Alps
Skiing films
Austrian comedy films
1950s German films